

See also
 Urban studies